John Hubbell (born May 9, 1948 in Sarnia, Ontario) was a Canadian pair skater.  With partner Mary Petrie, he won pair of silver medals at the Canadian Figure Skating Championships and competed at the 1972 Winter Olympics.

Results
pairs with Mary Petrie

References

1948 births
Canadian male pair skaters
Figure skaters at the 1972 Winter Olympics
Living people
Olympic figure skaters of Canada
Sportspeople from Sarnia